Poetic Hustla'z was an American rap group from Cleveland, Ohio, with three members: Boogie Nikke, Tony Tone and Mo! Hart. They first appeared together on the Bone Thugs-N-Harmony song "Shotz To Tha Double Glock" from the album E. 1999 Eternal in 1995. They released their debut album, Trials & Tribulations, in 1997 on Mo Thugs.

Background
Soon after Bone Thugs-N-Harmony became a multi-platinum success story, they began looking for home-grown Cleveland talent to sign to their label, Mo Thugs Records. The first in the family was Poetic Hustla'z, formed by Mo! Hart, Tony Tone, and Boogy Nikke. Boogy Nikke appeared on the Intro of B.O.N.E. Enterpri$e (Bone Thugs-N-Harmony) album "Faces of Death." As a trio they first appeared in 1995 on the song "Shotz To Tha Double Glock" from Bone Thugs-N-Harmony's album E. 1999 Eternal, and later on the Mo Thugs Family all-star project album Family Scriptures in 1996, then recorded their debut album, Trials & Tribulations, for release in November 1997.

Trials & Tribulations peaked at number 96 on the Billboard Top R&B/Hip-Hop Albums. Along with singles, music videos were released for two songs: "Trials & Tribulations" and "Day & Night" featuring Layzie Bone. The video for "Trials & Tribulations" features cameo appearances by Bizzy Bone and Flesh-n-Bone.

After 14 years of a large hiatus, in early 2015 , Poetic Hustla'z released a song "Poetic Hustlaz" featuring former Mo thugs member Souljah Boy, under a Cleveland independent record label, Taliup Records . The song's accompanying music video was released on April 4, 2015. However after that song, no signs of Poetic Hustla'z has been found. Former member Toney Tone now goes by Tone Chappell and has moved on and become a motivational speaker.

Discography

Studio albums

References

External links
[ Poetic Hustla'z] at Allmusic
Poetic Hustla'z at Discogs

American hip hop groups
Ruthless Records artists
Musical groups from Cleveland
Musical groups established in 1995
Gangsta rap groups
G-funk groups